John Inge Valfrid Johansson (8 October 1916 – 20 September 1966) was a Swedish chess player, Swedish Chess Championship winner (1958).

Biography
In the 1950s Inge Johansson was one of Sweden's leading chess players. During 1940-1958 he was 13 times (or 15, depending on which events to count) champion of Malmö. In Swedish Chess Championships Inge Johansson has won gold (1958) medal.

Inge Johansson played for Sweden in the Chess Olympiads:
 In 1950, at second board in the 9th Chess Olympiad in Dubrovnik (+5, =2, -5),
 In 1952, at reserve board in the 10th Chess Olympiad in Helsinki (+3, =3, -2),
 In 1958, at second board in the 13th Chess Olympiad in Munich (+2, =2, -7).

Inge Johansson suffered from a stroke on 16 September 1966, and died four days later.

References

External links

Inge Johansson chess games at 365chess.com

1916 births
1966 deaths
Sportspeople from Malmö
Swedish chess players
Chess Olympiad competitors
20th-century chess players